The 1970 Pau Grand Prix was a Formula Two motor race held on 5 April 1970 at the Pau circuit, in Pau, Pyrénées-Atlantiques, France. The Grand Prix was won by Jochen Rindt, driving the Lotus 69. Henri Pescarolo finished second and Tim Schenken third.

Classification

Race

References

Pau Grand Prix
1970 in French motorsport